Duran or Durán may refer to:

Places
 Duran, Gers, a commune in France
 Durán, Ecuador
 Duran, Iran, a village in Zanjan Province, Iran
 Duran, New Mexico
 Duran, a barangay in Dumalag, Capiz, Philippines

Entertainment
 Duran (comics), a supervillain in the pages of DC Comics
 Lieutenant Samir Duran, a character in the Starcraft universe
 Duran (Japanese musician), Japanese guitarist and musician

Other uses
 Duran (surname)
 Duran (glass), or DURAN, a brand name of borosilicate glass

See also
 Duran Duran, an English New Wave band
 Durand Durand, the villain in the 1968 film Barbarella
 Duran Consent Decree, stipulated agreement to Duran v. King court case